Zambiasi is the name of:

Ben Zambiasi, American football player
Fábio Zambiasi, Brazilian footballer